Ben Amera is Africa's largest monolith rising 633m (2027ft) above the desert floor. It's the world's second largest monolith only behind Uluru, in Australia. Ben Amera is located in Mauritania, near the border with Western Sahara. It lies 4km north of the train track where the famous Iron Ore Train travels between Nouâdibhou and Choûm. 

Nearby, a lesser monolith, Aïsha lies a 20-minute drive to the west of Ben Amera. "In 1999, a dozen artists of international fame celebrated the millennium by carving into the boulders at the base of Aïsha. They etched deep into the stone creating animal shapes as well as abstract. Some of the artworks are installation pieces that go beyond the boulder’s surface and use multiple stones in specific configurations to create their effect."

Getting There 
A 4x4 vehicle and an experienced desert driver is required to handle the deep, sandy track out to Ben Amera, as there is no paving once you leave the road that runs from Atar to Zouerrat. Drivers can be hired in Atar if you don't have your own vehicle. The rough path runs parallel to the tracks for the Iron Ore Train before crossing it at Km 395. As of December 2018, there was a small encampment near the tracks and a security checkpoint. Whereas at one point in time fiches were required for foreign travelers at these types of checkpoints, now, a simple photocopy of the traveler's passport usually suffices.

What to Take 
Get all of the food and water you'll think you need in Atar, whether for a day trip, or if you plan to camp overnight because there are no facilities anywhere near Ben Amera or Aïsha. Also make sure your vehicle is in top shape and that you have your repair kit on board. The path is rough and challenging and lightly traveled. If you get stuck, it may be a while before someone comes along that can help.

Also take a hat, and any sun protections you need. You may also want a bandanna, or the like, to cover your face if it gets windy.

Geological monoliths of Africa
 Brandberg Mountain, Namibia
 Aso Rock, Nigeria
 Zuma Rock, Nigeria

References

 Lexicorient

External links
10 largest monoliths of the world

Natural monoliths
Landforms of Mauritania